Claude-Jean-Baptiste Hoin (5 June 1750 – 16 July 1817) was a French artist known primarily for his portraits and landscapes.

Career
He worked in pastels for his portrait miniatures, and in gouache and engraving for his landscapes. He studied with François Devosge and Jean-Baptiste Greuze. He was a member of the Academy of the Sciences and Literature of Dijon (1776) and an honorary associate of the Royal Academy of Painting of Toulouse.

His works include a self-portrait in pastel (1787), and the portraits Mirabeau (1790), Guyard (1786), Madame Dugazon (ca. 1878), and (presumed) Rosalie Duthé. He is also noted for a pair of pastel portraits of the maternal grandmother and aunt of Octave de Rochebrune, which he signed as peintre de Monsieur, frère du roi ("painter of Monsieur, brother of the king"). These are noted for an ease of execution and the masterly lightness and transparency given to the sheer fabrics.

Personal life
Hoin died in Dijon, his birthplace.

Gallery

References

18th-century French painters
French male painters
19th-century French painters
1750 births
1817 deaths
Artists from Dijon
19th-century French male artists
18th-century French male artists